The Department of Family and Community Services is a part of the Government of New Brunswick, in Canada. It is charged with the administration of the province's social welfare and nursing home programs. On December 19, 2007, legislation was introduced to change its name to the Department of Social Development.

The department was established on March 23, 2000 when Premier Bernard Lord restructured the New Brunswick Cabinet. It was created merging the former Department of Income Assistance with parts of the Department of Municipalities and Housing and the Department of Health and Community Services.

Beginning in 2016, two ministers were named to jointly administer the department, a Minister of Families and Children and a Minister of Seniors and Long-Term Care.

Ministers of Social Development

Ministers of Families and Children 
At a 2016 cabinet shuffle, the government announced that the Department of Social Development would remain as a single department with a single deputy minister and senior management team but that the department would be jointly administered by two cabinet ministers.  The minister of families and children is responsible for child welfare and youth services, income security, housing services and wellness.

Ministers of Seniors and Long-Term Care 

At a 2016 cabinet shuffle, the government announced that the Department of Social Development would remain as a single department with a single deputy minister and senior management team but that the department would be jointly administered by two cabinet ministers.  The minister of seniors and long-term care is responsible for long-term care, nursing home services and the council on aging.

References

External links
Department of Family and Community Services

Social Development